The Hungarian Basketball Federation (MKOSZ) is the governing body of basketball in the Hungary.

It is a member of the International Basketball Federation (FIBA).

Hosted tournaments
Men's
EuroBasket 1955, 7–19 June 1955
1992 FIBA Europe Under-18 Championship, 16–23 August 1992
1987 FIBA Europe Under-16 Championship, Székesfehérvár & Kaposvár, 8–15 August 1992

Women's
EuroBasket Women 1950, 14–20 May 1950
EuroBasket Women 1964, 6–13 September 1964
EuroBasket Women 1983, 11–18 September 1983
EuroBasket Women 1997, 6–15 June 1997
EuroBasket Women 2015 (with ), 11–28 June 2015
2006 FIBA Europe Under-20 Championship for Women, Sopron
2012 FIBA Europe Under-20 Championship for Women, Debrecen, 16–26 August 2012
1981 FIBA Europe Under-18 Championship for Women, Eger & Kecskemét
2005 FIBA Europe Under-18 Championship for Women, Budapest
2016 FIBA Europe Under-18 Championship for Women, Sopron, 23–31 July 2016
1980 FIBA Europe Under-16 Championship for Women, Zalaegerszeg & Pécs, 6–15 August 1980
1997 FIBA Europe Under-16 Championship for Women, Sopron
2012 FIBA Europe Under-16 Championship for Women, Miskolc, 12–22 July 2012
2014 FIBA Europe Under-16 Championship for Women, Debrecen, 31 July–10 August 2014

Honours
Men's
 European Championship:  Winner (1 time - 1955);  Runner-up (1 time - 1953);  Third place (1 time - 1946)
Universiade:  Bronze medal - 1965

Women's
 European Championship:  Runner-up (2 times - 1950, 1956);  Third place (5 times - 1952, 1983, 1985, 1987, 1991)
Universiade:  Bronze medal - 1965

Divisions

Men's
Hungary national basketball team
Hungary national under-20 basketball team
Hungary national under-18 basketball team
Hungary national under-16 basketball team
Hungary national 3x3 team

Women's
Hungary women's national basketball team
Hungary women's national under-20 basketball team
Hungary women's national under-18 basketball team
Hungary women's national under-16 basketball team
Hungary women's national 3x3 team

Current head coaches

Competitions 
Magyar Kosárlabda Szövetség is responsible for organising the following competitions:

Men's basketball
Nemzeti Bajnokság I/A (Tier 1)
Nemzeti Bajnokság I/B (Tier 2) – two sections (East, West) 
Nemzeti Bajnokság II (Tier 3) – four sections (East, Central A, Central B, West)

Women's basketball
Nemzeti Bajnokság I/A (women) (Tier 1)
Nemzeti Bajnokság I/B (women) (Tier 2) – two sections (East, West)

Cups
Magyar Kupa – Men
Hepp-kupa
Magyar Kupa (women) – Women
Hepp-kupa (women)

Presidents
 Ferenc Szalay (2010– )

See also
Hungarian basketball league system

External links 
Magyar Kosárlabdázók Országos Szövetsége (official website)

Basketball in Hungary
Basketball
Organisations based in Budapest
1947 establishments in Hungary
Sports organizations established in 1947